Duke of York is a title of nobility in the Peerage of the United Kingdom. Since the 15th century, it has, when granted, usually been given to the second son of English (later British) monarchs. The equivalent title in the Scottish peerage was Duke of Albany. However, King George II and King George III granted the titles Duke of York and Albany.

Initially granted in the 14th century in the Peerage of England, the title Duke of York has been created eight times.  The title Duke of York and Albany has been created three times.  These occurred during the 18th century, following the 1707 unification of the Kingdom of England and Kingdom of Scotland into a single, united realm.  The double naming was done so that a territorial designation from each of the previously separate realms could be included.

The current Duke of York is Prince Andrew, the younger brother of Charles III. The present Duke's marriage produced two daughters, and he has remained unmarried since his 1996 divorce. As long as Prince Andrew has no legitimate male heirs, the title Duke of York will again revert to the Crown upon his death. A future monarch would then have the ability to bestow the title as a royal dukedom, in what would be its ninth creation. Prince Louis, the second son of William, Prince of Wales, is a likely candidate to be the next Duke of York after the death of his great-uncle, Prince Andrew, and after William becomes King.

History
In the Middle Ages, York was the main city of the North of England and the see of the Archbishop of York from AD 735. Yorkshire was England's largest shire in area.

York under its Viking name "Jorvik" was a petty kingdom in the Early Medieval period. In the interval between the fall of independent Jorvik under Eric Bloodaxe, last king of Jorvik (d. 954), and the first creation of the Dukedom of York, there were a few earls of York.

The title Duke of York was first created in the Peerage of England in 1385 for Edmund of Langley. His son Edward, who inherited the title, was killed at the Battle of Agincourt in 1415. The title passed to Edward's nephew Richard, the son of Richard of Conisburgh, 3rd Earl of Cambridge (who had been executed for plotting against King Henry V). The younger Richard managed to obtain a restoration of the title, but when his eldest son, who inherited the title, became king in 1461 as Edward IV, the title merged into the Crown.

The title was next created for Richard of Shrewsbury, second son of King Edward IV. Richard was one of the Princes in the Tower, and, as he died without heirs, the title became extinct at his death.

The third creation was for Henry Tudor, second son of King Henry VII. When his elder brother Arthur, Prince of Wales, died in 1502, Henry became heir-apparent to the throne. When Henry ultimately became King Henry VIII in 1509, his titles merged into the crown.

The title was created for the fourth time for Charles Stuart, second son of James I. When his elder brother, Henry Frederick, Prince of Wales, died in 1612, Charles became heir-apparent. He was created Prince of Wales in 1616 and eventually became Charles I in 1625 when the title again merged into the Crown.

The fifth creation was in favour of James Stuart, the second son of Charles I. New York, its capital Albany, and New York City, were named for this particular Duke of Albany and York. In 1664, Charles II of England granted American territory between the Delaware and Connecticut rivers to his younger brother James. Following its capture by the English the former Dutch territory of New Netherland and its principal port, New Amsterdam, were named the Province and City of New York in James's honour. After the founding, the Duke gave part of the colony to proprietors George Carteret and John Berkeley. When his elder brother, King Charles II, died without heirs, James succeeded to the throne as King James II of England and King James VII of Scotland, and the title once again merged into the Crown.

During the 18th century the double dukedom of York and Albany was created a number of times in the Peerage of Great Britain. The title was first held by Duke Ernest Augustus of Brunswick-Lüneburg, Bishop of Osnabrück, the youngest brother of King George I. He died without heirs, and the title reverted to the Crown. The second creation of the double dukedom was for Prince Edward, younger brother of King George III, who also died without heirs, having never married. Again, the title reverted to the Crown. The third and last creation of the double dukedom was for Prince Frederick Augustus, the second son of King George III. He served as Commander-in-Chief of the British Army for many years, and was the original "Grand old Duke of York" in the popular rhyme. He too died without legitimate heirs, leaving the title, once again, to revert to the Crown.

The sixth creation of the Dukedom of York (without being combined with Albany) was for Prince George, second son of the, then current, Prince of Wales, the future King Edward VII. He was created Duke of York following the death of his elder brother, Prince Albert Victor, Duke of Clarence and Avondale. The title merged with the Crown when George succeeded his father as King George V.

The seventh creation was for Prince Albert, second son of King George V, and younger brother of the future King Edward VIII. Albert came unexpectedly to the throne when his brother abdicated, and took the name George VI, the Dukedom then merging into the Crown.

The title was created for the eighth time for Prince Andrew, second son of Queen Elizabeth II. As of 2022, the only legitimate offspring are his two daughters from his marriage to Sarah, Duchess of York. Thus, if he has no future (legitimate) sons, the title will again become extinct—reverting to the Crown—upon his death.

Aside from the first creation, every time the Dukedom of York has been created it has had only one occupant, that person either inheriting the throne or dying without male heirs.

Pretenders 
In the late 15th Century, Perkin Warbeck unsuccessfully claimed the Crown by pretending the identity of Richard of Shrewsbury, 1st Duke of York. The pretend Dukedom was merged into the pretend Crown.

In the early 18th century, the eldest son of the overthrown King James II & VII and thus Jacobite claimant to the throne, James Francis Edward Stuart, known to his opponents as the Old Pretender, granted the title "Duke of York" (in the Jacobite Peerage) to his own second son, Henry, using his purported authority as King James III & VIII. Henry later became a cardinal in the Catholic church and is thus known as the Cardinal Duke of York. Since James was not recognised as king by English law, the grant is also not recognised as a legitimate creation.

Dukes of York

First creation, 1385–1461

| Edmund of Langley1385–1402
| 
| 5 June 1341Kings Langley4th surviving son of King Edward III and Philippa of Hainault
| Isabella of Castile13723 childrenJoan Hollandno children
|
1 August 1402Kings Langleyaged 61

|-
| Edward of Norwich1402–1415
| 
| 1373Norwichson of 1st Duke by his first wife  Isabella of Castile
| Philippa de Mohunno children
| 25 October 1415Battle of Agincourtaged 42

|-
| Richard of York1415–1460
| 
| 21 September 1411Nephew of 2nd Duke and son of Richard of Conisburgh, 3rd Earl of Cambridge (attainted and executed for treason in August 1415) and Anne de Mortimer; restored in blood
| Cecily Neville143713 children
| 30 December 1460Wakefieldaged 49

|-
| Edward Plantagenet1460–1461
| 
| 28 April 1442Rouenson of 3rd Duke by his wife Cecily Neville
| Elizabeth Woodville1 May 146410 children
| 9 April 1483Westminsteraged 40

|}

Edward Plantagenet seized the throne in 1461 as Edward IV and the title of duke merged in the crown.

Second creation, 1474

| Richard of Shrewsbury1474–1483
| 
|17 August 1473ShrewsburySecond son of King Edward IV and Elizabeth Woodville
| Anne de Mowbray15 January 1478no children
| Disappeared in the Tower of London, with his older brother, the "Princes in the Tower".

|}

Richard of Shrewsbury disappeared without known issue and the title of duke became extinct.

Third creation, 1494

|-
| Henry Tudor1494–1509
| 
| 28 June 1491Greenwich Palace, Londonson of Henry VII and Elizabeth of York
| Catherine of Aragon11 June 1509 – 23 May 1533(annulment)1 surviving daughter, others stillborn or briefly-livedAnne Boleyn25 January 1533 – 17 May 1536(annulment)1 daughterJane Seymour30 May 1536 – 24 October 15371 sonAnne of Cleves6 January 1540 – 9 July 1540(annulment)no childrenCatherine Howard28 July 1540 – 23 November 1541no childrenCatherine Parr12 July 1543no children
| 28 January 1547Whitehall Palace, Londonaged 55

|}

Prince Henry succeeded as Henry VIII in 1509 upon his father's death and the title of duke merged with the crown.

Fourth creation, 1605

|-
| Charles Stuart1605–1625
| 
| 19 November 1600Dunfermline Palace, Dunfermlineson of James I and Anne of Denmark
| Henrietta Maria of France13 June 16259 children
| 30 January 1649Whitehall Palace, Londonaged 48

|}

Prince Charles succeeded as Charles I in 1625 upon his father's death and the title of duke merged with the crown.

Fifth creation, 1633/1644

James was styled Duke of York from birth and officially created as such in 1644.

| James Stuart1633/1644–1685
| 
| 14 October 1633St. James's Palace, Londonson of Charles I and Henrietta Maria of France
| Anne Hyde3 September 16608 childrenMary of Modena21 November 16737 children
| 16 September 1701Château de Saint-Germain-en-Laye, Parisaged 67

|}

James succeeded as James II in 1685 upon his brother's death and the title of duke merged with the crown.

Jacobite creation, 1725

| Henry Benedict Stuart1725–1788
| 
| 6 March 1725Palazzo MutiRomePapal Statesson of "James III and VIII" (Jacobite Pretender) and Maria Clementina Sobieska
| 
| 13 July 1807Frascati, Romeaged 82

|}

In the Jacobite succession, the Cardinal Duke of York succeeded to the thrones of England, Ireland and Scotland as Henry IX, but was not recognized as either Duke or King in the British peerage.

Sixth creation, 1892

| George Frederick Ernest AlbertHouse of Saxe-Coburg and Gotha1892–1910
| 
| 3 June 1865Marlborough Houseson of Edward VII and Alexandra of Denmark
| Mary of Teck6 July 18936 children
| 20 January 1936Sandringham House, Sandringhamaged 70
|-
|Colspan=5|George succeeded as George V in 1910 upon his father's death and the title of duke merged with the crown.
|}

Seventh creation, 1920

| Albert Frederick Arthur George House of Windsor1920–1936
| 
| 14 December 1895Sandringham House, Sandringhamson of George V and Mary of Teck
| Elizabeth Bowes-Lyon26 April 19232 daughters
| 6 February 1952Sandringham House, Sandringhamaged 56
|-
|Colspan=5|George VI succeeded to the throne in 1936 upon his brother's abdication and the title of duke merged with the crown.
|}

Eighth creation, 1986

| Andrew Albert Christian EdwardHouse of Windsor1986– 
| 
| 19 February 1960Buckingham Palaceson of Elizabeth II and Prince Philip, Duke of Edinburgh
| Sarah Ferguson23 July 1986 – 30 May 1996(divorce)2 daughters
|  now  old

|}

Family tree

Places and things named after the dukes of York

Geographic features

Southern hemisphere
 Cape York Peninsula, Australia
 Duke of York Island, Antarctica
 Duke of York Island, Papua New Guinea
 Duke of York Islands, Papua New Guinea

Canada
 Duke of York Archipelago, Canada
 Duke of York Bay, Canada

Political entities

Canada
 York, Upper Canada, now Toronto, Ontario
 York County, New Brunswick, Canada

United States
 New York, a U.S. state
 New York City, the largest city in the state of New York.

Schools
 Duke of York's Royal Military School, Dover, Kent, United Kingdom
 Duke of York School, Nairobi, Kenya, renamed Lenana School after Kenya attained independence in 1963.

Pubs
 Duke of York, Bloomsbury
 Duke of York Inn, Elton
 The Duke of York, Fitzrovia
 Duke of York, Ganwick Corner

Ships
HMS Duke of York (1763), a 4-gun cutter purchased in 1763 and sold in 1776
HMS Duke of York (17), a King George V-class battleship launched in 1940, and broken up in 1958
Hired armed cutter Duke of York
Hired armed lugger Duke of York
TSS Duke of York (1894)
TSS Duke of York (1935)

Railroad Equipment
 Duke of York was one of the GWR 3031 Class locomotives that were built for and run on the Great Western Railway between 1891 and 1915.

See also
Duke of Albany
Duke of York and Albany
Earl of Inverness, a subsidiary title of the current creation
Baron Killyleagh, a subsidiary title of the current creation
Henry Benedict Stuart, created Duke of York in the Jacobite Peerage by his father the titular King James III in 1725.  Living in Italy as a cardinal of the Roman Catholic Church, he called himself the "Cardinal Duke of York" (or "Cardinal called Duke of York") for most of his life and was recognised as such by the Papacy, Modena, France, and Spain. He became the Jacobite pretender himself as "Henry IX" in 1788.  The last surviving legitimate descendant of James II, his grandfather, he died without issue in 1807.

References

Sources
 Miller, John (2000). James II, 3rd ed. .

External links
 The Duke of York at the Royal Family website

 
1385 establishments in England
1892 establishments in the United Kingdom
Dukedoms in the Peerage of the United Kingdom
British and Irish peerages which merged in the Crown
Noble titles created in 1385
Noble titles created in 1474
Noble titles created in 1494
Noble titles created in 1605
Noble titles created in 1644
Noble titles created in 1725
Noble titles created in 1892
Noble titles created in 1920
Noble titles created in 1986
Dukedoms in the Jacobite Peerage